The Marañón spinetail (Synallaxis maranonica) is a species of bird in the family Furnariidae. It is found in Ecuador and Peru. Its natural habitats are subtropical or tropical dry forests, subtropical or tropical moist lowland forests, and subtropical or tropical dry shrubland. It is threatened by habitat loss.

References

Marañón spinetail
Birds of the Ecuadorian Andes
Birds of the Peruvian Andes
Critically endangered animals
Critically endangered biota of South America
Marañón spinetail
Marañón spinetail
Taxonomy articles created by Polbot